Johann Urb (born 24 January 1977) is an Estonian-American actor, producer, and former model.

Early life and education
Johann Urb was born in Tallinn to parents Tarmo and Maris Urb. His father is an Estonian musician and the brother of actor and singer Toomas Urb. At the age of ten, he moved to live in Finland with his mother and her new Finnish husband, where he was raised primarily in Tampere. After turning 17, Urb moved to the United States, where his father lived, and began his career in modeling in New York City, which led him later on to pursuing a career in acting. He studied drama at the Lee Strasberg Theatre and Film Institute.

Career
In 2001, Urb landed a small part in the film Zoolander. Later, he made an appearance in the short film Fear of Feathers and had a role in one episode of CSI: Miami. In 2004, Urb appeared in the short-running television series The Mountain. Following that, he guest starred in several television shows and made smaller film roles.

In 2005, Urb played a tall, Scandinavian-vintage worker, an awkward yet loyal ranch hand for Willie and Missie LeHay in "Love's Long Journey," the third installment in the 8-episode Hallmark television series "Love Comes Softly."

Urb would then get his first major film role in The Hottie and the Nottie in 2008. The next year, Urb made a short appearance in Roland Emmerich's disaster epic 2012 as a heroic pilot and he played a journalist in the fantasy TV series Eastwick. He also played the part of Leon S. Kennedy in Resident Evil: Retribution, which was released in 2012. He also played the part of U.S. Park Ranger Burt Moore, the boyfriend of Abby Sciuto in the series NCIS.

Filmography

Film

Television

References

External links
 

1977 births
Living people
21st-century American male actors
21st-century Estonian male actors
American male film actors
American male models
American male television actors
Estonian emigrants to the United States
Estonian expatriates in Finland
Estonian male film actors
Estonian male models
Estonian male television actors
Lee Strasberg Theatre and Film Institute alumni
Male actors from Tallinn
male actors from Tampere